All Saints Anglican School ("ASAS" or "All Saints") is a private, co-educational school established in 1987 under the Aegis of the Anglican Diocese of Brisbane. The school is located on a 40-hectare campus in the Gold Coast Hinterland. All Saints is divided into three sub-schools: the Junior School (kindergarten to Year 6), the Middle School (Years 7 to 9) and the Senior School (Years 10 to 12). It has a total student body of approximately 1850 students. In 2012 All Saints celebrated its 25th year on 1 November (Foundation Day).

Merrimac Campus
The school houses two swimming pools, one indoor and one outdoor, both heated. It also has extensive playing fields and sporting facilities including a large three-storey Health and Physical Education Centre including a well resourced work-out room, indoor and outdoor basketball, tennis, hockey and volleyball courts and a small golf course. The campus also features a multi-level science facility complete with a lecture theatre for over 200 students, a purpose built music centre and a professional theatre space consisting of the main theatre seating 530 (the Nairn Theatre), a smaller theatre (the Dell'Arte), a full costume department and a green room. The Holloway Music Centre consists of two large practice spaces for band and oral rehearsals, classrooms and a number of individual sound-proof studios  used for individual or small group tuition. A new Chapel was completed in early 2012. A new international house was constructed in late 2018.

House system
The Junior School consists of four different houses named after the dairy farms that were previously located near the School campus: Lyndon, Oakey, Talgai, and Clovelly.

The Middle and Senior Schools together have eight houses named after School Council Members: Fradgley, McIntosh, Day, Burling, Burchill, Reeves, Hobart, and Rapp.

A variety of activities are undertaken via house based competitions including swimming, athletics, cross country, chess, singing and  public speaking.

Notable alumni

Entertainment
Ash Pollard (Radio & Television Personality)
Cody Simpson (Singer)

Sport

ASAS International
The School also has its own English Language Centre called International House.  It gives international students the option to live either on campus in its boarding facility which houses 60 students or in homestay accommodation while they complete short term English language courses or attend the school in mainstream classes.

Extracurricular activities
All Saints offers a wide variety of extra-curricular activities including music, drama, choir and sporting activities. A variety of outdoor experiences are also offered at the School and participating students learn physical skills and leadership. As well, the School offers the Duke of Edinburgh's Award and holiday ski trips. 
Students may also participate in a number of language and cultural experiences and trips which are regularly undertaken to New Caledonia, France, Japan, China, Italy and Spain.

The Japanese Language Supplementary School of Queensland Japanese School of Gold Coast (Gōrudo Kōsuto Kō), a weekend Japanese school, holds its classes at All Saints. It maintains its school office in Surfers Paradise.

References

External links
 All Saints Anglican School's website

Schools on the Gold Coast, Queensland
Junior School Heads Association of Australia Member Schools
Educational institutions established in 1987
Anglican schools in Queensland
1987 establishments in Australia